David O'Reilly may refer to:

 David OReilly (artist) (born 1985), Irish filmmaker and artist
 David O'Reilly, BBC Northern Ireland presenter more commonly known as Rigsy
 David J. O'Reilly (born 1947), chairman of Chevron Corporation

 David D. O'Reilly (born 1974), Irish Writer and Adventurer.